Cervara di Roma is a  (municipality) in the Metropolitan City of Rome in the Italian region of Latium, located about  east of Rome. Cervara di Roma borders the following municipalities: Agosta, Arsoli, Camerata Nuova, Marano Equo, Rocca di Botte, Subiaco.
 
It was founded by Benedictine monks in the 8th or 9th century.  The historic center of Cervara can only be reached by foot after a  climb. The village is located in the Monti Simbruini Regional Park.

Cervara has experienced a steady loss of population since World War II as residents left farming for jobs in nearby Rome. With approximately 75 percent of Cervara's inhabitants over the age of 60, the town's population dipped to 471 in 2015.

References

External links 
Cervara di Roma 

Cities and towns in Lazio
Hilltowns in Lazio